Free and Easy is the sixth studio album by Australian-American pop singer Helen Reddy that was released in the fall of 1974 by Capitol Records. The album included rare forays into rock ("Raised on Rock") and vaudeville ("Showbiz"). The album debuted on Billboard'''s Top LP's & Tapes chart in the issue dated November 2, 1974, and reached number eight during its 28 weeks there. The following month, on December 18, the Recording Industry Association of America awarded the album with Gold certification for sales of 500,000 copies in the United States. In the UK it peaked at number 17, and in Canada's RPM magazine it got as high as number nine on its list of the top LPs in the issue dated January 11, 1975. On January 27, 2004, it was released for the first time on compact disc as one of two albums on one CD, the other album being her other 1974 release, Love Song for Jeffrey.



Singles
"Angie Baby", which was released on October 14, 1974, as the first single from the album, debuted on Billboard's  Hot 100 in the issue of the magazine dated October 19, and enjoyed a week at number one over the course of its 17 weeks there. It also had one week atop the magazine's Easy Listening chart during a 13-week run that began in the issue dated November 2. On January 13, 1975, the song earned Gold certification for sales of the one million copies that was the requirement for singles at that time, and in the issue of RPM dated January 25 of that year it peaked at number three on the Canadian singles chart. In the UK it got as high as number five during its nine weeks on the singles chart there.

A second single, "Emotion", was released on January 20, 1975, and made it to number 22 during its nine weeks on the pop chart that began in the February 8 issue. That same issue also included its first appearance on the Easy Listening chart, where it stayed for 12 weeks, one of which was spent at number one, and it also reached number 25 pop in Canada. While the album track clocks in at 4:10, the song was edited down to a 2:52 running time for the 7-inch format.

"Free and Easy" was a number-one hit in New Zealand. and was certified gold.  It was also a minor hit in Australia.

ReceptionBillboard'' was very enthusiastic in its review: "Cut for cut, this is unquestionably the best Reddy LP yet. Only one or two of the songs could not be seriously pushed for a hit single. The wide-ranging choice of material is particularly effective."

Track listing
Side 1
 "Angie Baby" (Alan O'Day) – 3:29
 "Raised on Rock" (Mark James) – 3:12
 "I've Been Wanting You So Long" (Peter Allen, Jeff Barry) – 3:40
 "You Have Lived" (Don McLean) – 3:48
 "I'll Be Your Audience" (Lewis Anderson, Becky Hobbs) – 3:19
Side 2
 "Emotion" (Patti Dahlstrom, Véronique Sanson) – 4:10
 "Free and Easy" (Tom Jans) – 2:46
 "Loneliness" (Kenny Ascher, Paul Williams) – 3:30
 "I Think I'll Write a Song" (Peter Allen, Helen Reddy) – 2:22
 "Showbiz" (Dennis Tracy) – 3:04

Charts

Certifications

Personnel
Helen Reddy – vocals
Joe Wissert – producer 
Nick DeCaro – arranger and conductor ; background vocal ("Free and Easy")
Pointer Sisters – background vocal  ("Showbiz")
Tom Perry – recording engineer
Bruce Botnick – recording engineer 
Jeff Wald – management
Virgil Mirano – cover and liner photography
Roy Kohara – art direction
Michael Bryan – illustration

Notes

References

 

1974 albums
Capitol Records albums
Helen Reddy albums
Albums produced by Joe Wissert